Jigna Gajjar (born 28 September 1982) is a Gujarati cricketer and cricket coach. She plays for West Zone.

References 

1982 births
Living people
Saurashtra women cricketers
West Zone women cricketers
People from Gujarat